The hundred of Berkeley was one of the ancient hundreds of Gloucestershire, England.  Hundreds originated in the late Saxon period as a subdivision of a county and lasted as administrative divisions until the 19th century.

Berkeley Hundred was divided into two separate parts, the Lower Division and the Upper Division.

The Lower Division consisted of several detached parts, including the ancient parishes of
Elberton
Filton
Hill
Horfield
Almondsbury (part)
Henbury (part)

The Upper Division consisted of the parishes of
Arlingham (a detached part of the hundred, separated from the rest of the hundred by the hundred of Whitstone)
Ashleworth
Berkeley
Beverston
Cam
Coaley
Cromhall Abbotts
Dursley
Kingscote
Newington Bagpath
North Nibley
Nympsfield
Owlpen
Ozleworth
Slimbridge
Stinchcombe
Uley
Wotton-under-Edge
Rockhampton (part)

The meeting place was at Berkeley.

References

National Gazetteer of Great Britain and Ireland (1868)

Berkeley
Berkeley, Gloucestershire